PDX Sliders is a restaurant with two locations in Portland, Oregon.

Description 
PDX Sliders is a restaurant with two locations in Portland. The menu includes sliders and full-size burgers (with chicken, pork, or vegetables), salads, loaded fries, and cocktails. The sandwiches are named after Portland bridges and streets. The Hawthorne has bacon, goat cheese, and strawberry preserves on brioche, and the Burlington has pecan-smoked pork. The Sellwood has a beef patty, cheddar cheese by Beecher's Handmade Cheese, bacon, caramelized onions, butter lettuce, and aioli, on brioche.

History 
PDX Sliders is owned by Ryan Rollins, who opened the business as a food cart in 2014. PDX Sliders began operating as a brick and mortar restaurant on Bybee Boulevard in southeast Portland's Sellwood-Moreland neighborhood on January 21, 2017. In October, Rollins announced plans to expand to the former Sunshine Tavern space on Division Street in the Richmond neighborhood. He hoped to open by December 1. The restaurant opened on December 8 with a seating capacity of approximately 45. In September 2019, Drew Carney of KGW said PDX Sliders had "plans to unveil a third [location] by the end of the year".

Reception 

In 2016, PDX Sliders ranked number four in National Geographic "The Best Burgers in America: A Definitive Guide", based on Yelp data. Alex Frane included PDX Sliders in Thrillist's 2019 list of "The 11 Best Spots to Smash a Burger in Portland". He also included the restaurant in Eater Portland's 2019 overview of "where to imbibe and dine" in Sellwood and Westmoreland. Katrina Yentch and staff included PDX Sliders in the website's 2022 list of "22 Go-to Spots for Affordable Dining in Portland".

In 2021, Zuri Anderson included PDX Sliders in iHeart's overview of "Where You Can Find the Best Loaded Fries in Portland", and said the restaurant was the second highest-rated in Portland for burgers based on Yelp data. Writers ranked the restaurant number 10 in Portland Monthly's 2021 list of "Portland's 20 Best Cheeseburgers, Exhaustively Argued and Ranked".

References

External links 

 
 

2014 establishments in Oregon
Food carts in Portland, Oregon
Restaurants established in 2014
Restaurants in Portland, Oregon
Richmond, Portland, Oregon
Sellwood-Moreland, Portland, Oregon